Vineyards is a census-designated place (CDP) in Collier County, Florida, United States. The population was 3,883 at the 2020 census. It is part of the Naples–Marco Island Metropolitan Statistical Area.

Geography

Demographics

2020 census

As of the 2020 United States census, there were 3,883 people, 1,908 households, and 1,295 families residing in the CDP.

2000 census
As of the census of 2000, there were 2,232 people, 1,023 households, and 804 families residing in the CDP. The racial makeup of the CDP was 97.98% White, 0.76% African American, 0.04% Native American, 0.40% Asian, 0.49% from other races, and 0.31% from two or more races. Hispanic or Latino of any race were 2.46% of the population.

There were 1,023 households, out of which 13.8% had children under the age of 18 living with them, 74.9% were married couples living together, 2.9% had a female householder with no husband present, and 21.4% were non-families. 18.9% of all households were made up of individuals, and 9.6% had someone living alone who was 65 years of age or older.  The average household size was 2.13 and the average family size was 2.40.

In the CDP, the population was spread out, with 12.8% under the age of 18, 1.3% from 18 to 24, 11.2% from 25 to 44, 34.7% from 45 to 64, and 39.9% who were 65 years of age or older.  The median age was 61 years. For every 100 females, there were 88.4 males.  For every 100 females age 18 and over, there were 87.9 males.

The median income for a household in the CDP was $71,597 in 2016. Males had a median income of $46,151 versus $28,964 for females.

References

Census-designated places in Collier County, Florida
Census-designated places in Florida